Ralph Richard Wenzel (March 14, 1943 – June 18, 2012) was a professional American football player who played guard for seven seasons for the Pittsburgh Steelers and San Diego Chargers.

Early onset of dementia
Wenzel's name gained notoriety in late 2009, when Wenzel's wife, Dr. Eleanor Perfetto, testified on Wenzel's dementia. Perfetto testified that Wenzel's football career probably had a causal effect with his dementia.

References

External links
 NYTimes article on dementia :
 Wives United by Husbands’ Post-N.F.L. Trauma
 Case Will Test N.F.L. Teams’ Liability in Dementia

1943 births
2012 deaths
American football offensive guards
San Diego State Aztecs football players
Sportspeople from the San Francisco Bay Area
People from San Mateo, California
Pittsburgh Steelers players
Players of American football from California
San Diego Chargers players